The Ballymoney and Moyle Times is a regional newspaper covering the north-east area of Northern Ireland. The paper is owned by the holding company Johnston Publishing (NI), who took it over in 2005.

It was first published in 2000.

References

Newspapers published in Northern Ireland
Mass media in County Antrim
Johnston Publishing (NI)
Newspapers published by Johnston Press